The 2021–22 Regionalliga was the 14th season of the Regionalliga, the tenth under the new format, as the fourth tier of the German football league system.

Format
According to the promotion rules decided upon in 2019, the Regionalliga Südwest and West received a direct promotion spot. Based on a rotation principle, the Regionalliga Bayern also received the third direct promotion spot this season, while the Regionalliga Nord and Nordost champions played a promotion play-off.

Regionalliga Nord
21 teams from the states of Bremen, Hamburg, Lower Saxony and Schleswig-Holstein competed in the tenth season of the reformed Regionalliga Nord. VfB Lübeck was relegated from the 2020–21 3. Liga. Originally, SV Meppen was also relegated from the 3. Liga, but was spared after KFC Uerdingen did not receive a license. No teams were promoted from the 2020–21 Oberliga Niedersachsen, 2020–21 Oberliga Hamburg, 2020–21 Bremen-Liga or 2020–21 Schleswig-Holstein-Liga since the seasons were abandoned.

The league was split into two regional groups again. The composition of the groups was retained from the previous season, with the exception of Lüneburger SK Hansa, who were moved to the southern group to balance out the group sizes.

Nord

Top scorers

Süd

Top scorers

Championship round
All results achieved against other teams qualified for the championship round were retained. The teams only played against teams from the other regional division.

Top scorers

Relegation round
All results achieved against other teams qualified for the relegation round were retained. The teams only played against teams from the other regional division.

Top scorers

Regionalliga Nordost
20 teams from the states of Berlin, Brandenburg, Mecklenburg-Vorpommern, Saxony, Saxony-Anhalt and Thuringia competed in the tenth season of the reformed Regionalliga Nordost. Tasmania Berlin was promoted from the 2020–21 NOFV-Oberliga Nord and FC Eilenburg was promoted from the 2020–21 NOFV-Oberliga Süd.

Top scorers

Regionalliga West
20 teams from North Rhine-Westphalia competed in the tenth season of the reformed Regionalliga West. KFC Uerdingen was relegated from the 2020–21 3. Liga. No teams were promoted from the 2020–21 Mittelrheinliga, 2020–21 Oberliga Niederrhein or 2020–21 Oberliga Westfalen since the seasons were abandoned.

Top scorers

Regionalliga Südwest
19 teams from Baden-Württemberg, Hesse, Rhineland-Palatinate and Saarland competed in the tenth season of the Regionalliga Südwest. No teams were promoted from the 2020–21 Oberliga Rheinland-Pfalz/Saar, 2020–21 Oberliga Baden-Württemberg or 2020–21 Hessenliga since the seasons were abandoned.

Top scorers

Regionalliga Bayern
20 teams from Bavaria compete in the ninth season of the Regionalliga Bayern. Bayern Munich II and SpVgg Unterhaching were relegated from the 2020–21 3. Liga. SC Eltersdorf was promoted from the 2019–2021 Bayernliga Nord and FC Pipinsried was promoted from the 2019–2021 Bayernliga Süd.

Top scorers

Relegation play-offs

|}

Promotion play-offs
The order of the legs was determined in a draw. The matches take place on 28 May and 4 June 2022.

|}

All times Central European Summer Time (UTC+2)

VfB Oldenburg won 3–2 on aggregate.

References

External links
 Regionalliga   DFB.de
 Regionalliga Nord  nordfv.de
 Regionalliga West  wdfv.de
 Regionalliga Bayern  bfv.de

2021-22
4
2021–22 in European fourth tier association football leagues